Gluepot Reserve is a private protected area located in the Australian state of South Australia in the gazetted locality of Gluepot about  north of the town of Waikerie.

History
The decision to purchase Gluepot Station, Birds Australia's first reserve, was taken in order to protect its outstanding floral and fauna values, under threat because of an application by the lessee to burn the property to provide grazing for sheep.

Birds
Nearly 200 species of birds have been recorded at Gluepot Reserve.  These include the nationally threatened malleefowl, regent parrot, red-lored whistler and black-eared miner.  A further 33 species are considered to be regionally threatened.  Scarlet-chested parrots are known to have bred on Gluepot in the past, and still visit the reserve.

Conservation
Gluepot Reserve has a protected area status due to being the subject of a native vegetation heritage agreement created under the Native Vegetation Act 1991 (SA) where its owner, BirdLife Australia, has agreed to protect the property's native vegetation in perpetuity.   It is classified as an IUCN Category III protected area, and lies within both the Riverland Biosphere Reserve and the Riverland Mallee Important Bird Area.

See also
 Protected areas of South Australia
 Taylorville Station (reserve)
 Calperum Station (reserve)

References

External links

 Gluepot Reserve official website

Private protected areas of South Australia
Protected areas established in 2000
2000 establishments in Australia
Murray Mallee